Bezirk Braunau am Inn is a district of the state of
Upper Austria in Austria.

History
During the Bavarian uprising of 1705 and 1706 the country defense congress ("Braunau Parliament") was held in Braunau. In addition to leader Johann Georg Meindl, born in Weng, Christian Probst wrote of other leaders from the court of Braunau: old Hofbauer from Wuerlach, the rotbartete Schwaiger, Schienkhueber zu Mitterndorf, Neuhauser zu Hochburg, Meindlsberger in office at Eggelsberg, the innkeeper of Ibm and Baron of Taufkirchen, who was a civil servant there.

The district was created in 1868.

Franz Xaver Gruber composer of the Christmas carol "Stille Nacht" ("Silent Night") was born in the district in 1787. Adolf Hitler was born here on 20 April 1889.

Memorial blocks

The Cologne artist Gunter Demnig laid 13 Stolperstein memorial blocks for victims of National Socialism on the 11 and 12 August in the district of Braunau am Inn.
The former "home district of the Führer" was the first district or county in German-speaking Europe to memorialize Nazi victims in this form and on this scale. Gunter Demnig has placed over 20,000 paving stones with the inscription "Hier wohnte" (German for "here lived") in front of the houses of Nazi victims since 1997. However, this occurred mostly in cities and in rural communities the practice remained the exception.

Municipalities 
The district of Braunau am Inn is divided into 46 municipalities, including three towns (Städte) (indicated in bold) and five market towns (Marktgemeiden) (indicated in italics)

Suburbs, hamlets and other subdivisions of a municipality are indicated in small characters.
 Altheim
 Aspach
 Auerbach
 Braunau am Inn
 Burgkirchen
 Eggelsberg
 Feldkirchen bei Mattighofen
 Franking
 Geretsberg
 Gilgenberg am Weilhart
 Haigermoos
 Handenberg
 Helpfau-Uttendorf
 Hochburg-Ach
 Höhnhart
 Jeging
 Kirchberg bei Mattighofen
 Lengau
 Lochen
 Maria Schmolln
 Mattighofen
 Mauerkirchen
 Mining
 Moosbach
 Moosdorf
 Munderfing
 Neukirchen an der Enknach
 Ostermiething
 Palting
 Perwang am Grabensee
 Pfaffstätt
 Pischelsdorf am Engelbach
 Polling im Innkreis
 Roßbach
 Sankt Georgen am Fillmannsbach
 Sankt Johann am Walde
 Sankt Pantaleon
 Sankt Peter am Hart
 Sankt Radegund
 Sankt Veit im Innkreis
 Schalchen
 Schwand im Innkreis
 Tarsdorf
 Treubach
Überackern
 Weng im Innkreis

External links 

Official site